Carex pseudobrizoides is a species of flowering plant belonging to the family Cyperaceae.

Its native range is Western Europe to Latvia.

References

pseudobrizoides